Nikos Paleokrassas (born 25 March 1968) is a Greek swimmer. He competed in two events at the 1992 Summer Olympics.

References

1968 births
Living people
Greek male swimmers
Olympic swimmers of Greece
Swimmers at the 1992 Summer Olympics
Sportspeople from Indiana